Sarah Monfort is a costume designer.

Biography 

After a year in the atelier de Sèvres, she graduated from the École nationale supérieure des arts décoratifs, specialized in fashion in Gaspard Yurkievich's class, whom she followed to Rodier. She started at an internship at Vanessa Bruno, Karine Arabian et Malhia et Estrella Archs from Cacharel. She is related to the producer Christine Vachon.

Filmography

Costume designer

Long feature films 
 2006: Marie-Antoinette 
 2007: I'm not there 
 2010: Inception 
 2011: Les Bien-Aimés 
 2011: Un jour 
 2011: Le premier homme 
 2011: 360 
 2011: Hugo Cabret 
 2011: Sherlock Holmes 
 2011: L'air de rien 
 2013: Duo d'escrocs 
 2013: Jacky au royaume des filles 
 2014: Helix Aspersa 
 2014: 15 francs, des fleurs et une culotte

Short film 
 2010: Ton sale chien 
 2010: Aglaée 
 2010: Antonin et les oiseaux 
 2010: La France qui se lève tôt 
 2011: Déjeuner à Foisse 
 2011: Alexis Ivanovitch, vous êtes mon héros 
 2011: Les poissons préfèrent l'eau du bain 
 2012: La ville est calme 
 2012: Tennis elbow 
 2012: Bal de nuit 
 2013: L'homme qui en connaissait un rayon

Television 
 2007: Viver a vida 
 2013: Castle

Documentaire 
 2007: Planet B-boy

Actress 
 2003: Rien, voilà l'ordre by Jacques Baratier:  nurse

References

External links 
 
 Sarah Monfort, AlloCiné
 Sarah Monfort, Unifrance
 Sarah Monfort at the New York Times
 Sarah Monfort at AllMusic.com
 French-language story about On verra bien si on se noie at Ulule.com

1980 births
Living people
Film people from Paris
French costume designers
Women costume designers
École nationale supérieure des arts décoratifs alumni